Old Europa Cafe is an Italian independent record label and mail order service specializing in ambient music, noise music, electronic music, and industrial music. It is based in Pordenone. Originating in the early 1980s Old Europa Cafe began as a small cassette label. Some of the original Old Europa Cafe artists included De Fabriek, Mauro Teho Teardo, and Brume. According to founder Rodolfo Protti, Old Europa Cafe has two guidelines for musick it releases—uncompromising industrial sounds and esoteric dark ambient styles.

Artists

See also

 List of record labels
 List of electronic music record labels
 Old europa cafe discography

References

External links
 Old Europa Cafe.com - official website

Electronic music record labels
Italian independent record labels
Record labels established in 1980
Ambient music record labels
Noise music record labels
Industrial record labels